2009 World Junior Championships may refer to:

 Figure skating: 2009 World Junior Figure Skating Championships
 Ice hockey: 2009 World Junior Ice Hockey Championships
 Ringette: 2009 World Junior Ringette Championships
 Motorcycle speedway:
 2009 Individual Speedway Junior World Championship
 2009 Team Speedway Junior World Championship

See also
 2009 World Cup (disambiguation)
 2009 Continental Championships (disambiguation)
 2009 World Championships (disambiguation)